Bradley Hudson-Odoi (born 29 November 1988) is a Ghanaian footballer who last played as a striker for National League South side, Woking.

Background
Born in Accra, Hudson-Odoi is the son of former Hearts of Oak midfielder Bismark Odoi and the older brother of Chelsea forward Callum Hudson-Odoi.

Club career
He joined Fulham at the age of 12 but never played for the first team. He signed for Hereford United on 16 July 2008. He made his debut for Hereford in a 2–1 defeat against Leyton Orient.

In March 2009, Hudson-Odoi signed for Grays Athletic on an initial one-month loan with a view to a permanent deal after spending two weeks on trial with the Conference National club. He made his debut on 7 March 2009 in the 2–1 home win over Altrincham, supplying Jamie Slabber with a cross to score Grays' second goal. He joined Histon on a contract until January 2010 in August 2009. He rejoined Grays on a month's loan on 27 November. He rejoined Grays Athletic for a third time on 26 October 2010, before joining Conference South club Thurrock in December. After a stint abroad at Hungarian side Vasas, Bradley joined Metropolitan Police on trial, before signing a contract in January 2014. Playing for Wealdstone in the 2015–16 season, Bradley was voted their player of the season. After the season ended, Wealdstone announced Bradley's departure for a team in the National League, later announced as Sutton United.

Hudson-Odoi made his first league appearance for Sutton as a substitute on their opening day defeat of the 2016–17 season to Solihull Moors on 6 August 2016, coming on for Roarie Deacon, before making his first full appearance and debut in a 2–0 win over Torquay United on 16 August. On his third appearance for Sutton, he scored his first league goal for the club and the winner in a 1–0 home victory over Dagenham & Redbridge on 29 August 2016 when he connected with Ross Stearn's cross and struck a half volley 11 minutes into the game. On 10 November 2016 Hudson-Odoi joined Maidstone United on loan for one month.

Hudson-Odoi appeared in Sutton's historic run to the fifth round of the FA Cup for the first time ever, including a 3–1 victory over League One side and local rivals AFC Wimbledon in the third round on 17 January 2017, and a 2–0 defeat to Premier League team Arsenal in the fifth round on 20 February. On 23 February 2018, he was released by Sutton and signed for Hampton & Richmond Borough. On 22 May 2018, Hudson-Odoi returned to Wealdstone. On 25 January 2019, Hudson-Odoi left Wealdstone after an injury hit season and soon reunited with former manager, Alan Dowson at fellow National League South side, Woking. However, just after featuring twice for the Surrey-based side, Hudson-Odoi opted to leave the club in February 2019.

International career
He was part of the Ghana U20 squad for the 2007 Toulon Tournament.

Career statistics

References

External links

1985 births
Living people
Footballers from Accra
Ghanaian footballers
Association football forwards
Fulham F.C. players
Hereford United F.C. players
Grays Athletic F.C. players
Histon F.C. players
Thurrock F.C. players
Vasas SC players
Metropolitan Police F.C. players
Wealdstone F.C. players
Sutton United F.C. players
Maidstone United F.C. players
Hampton & Richmond Borough F.C. players
Eastleigh F.C. players
Woking F.C. players
English Football League players
National League (English football) players
Isthmian League players
Ghanaian expatriate footballers
Expatriate footballers in Hungary
Ghanaian expatriate sportspeople in Hungary